Octriptyline (SC-27,123) is a tricyclic antidepressant (TCA) that was never marketed.

See also 
 Benzocycloheptenes

References 

Tricyclic antidepressants
Cyclopropanes